Bernard Due Van Vu, (1755 – August 1, 1838) was a Vietnamese convert to Catholicism. He became a priest and worked as a missionary in the country for several decades. He was arrested and beheaded in 1838 for being a Roman Catholic priest in Tonkin. He was later canonised as one of the Martyrs of Vietnam.

References

1755 births
1838 deaths
Vietnamese Roman Catholic priests
Vietnamese Roman Catholic saints
Converts to Roman Catholicism
18th-century Roman Catholic priests
19th-century Roman Catholic priests
19th-century Roman Catholic martyrs
People executed by Vietnam by decapitation
Beatifications by Pope Leo XIII